The 1973 Open Championship was the 102nd Open Championship, played 11–14 July at Troon Golf Club in Troon, Scotland. Tom Weiskopf won his only major championship by three strokes over runners-up Neil Coles and Johnny Miller, the winner of the U.S. Open a month earlier. Weiskopf was a wire-to-wire winner and his four-round total of 12-under-par 276 matched the then-existing Open Championship record set by Arnold Palmer on the same course in 1962.

Gene Sarazen, 71, made a hole-in-one in the first round at the famous 8th hole, a  par-3 named the "Postage Stamp," due to its small green. Lee Trevino's bid for a third straight Open fell short, thirteen strokes back in a tie for tenth place.

This was the course's last Open Championship under the name Troon Golf Club; it became Royal Troon Golf Club five years later in 1978, and next hosted in 1982.

Course

Old Course 

Lengths of the course for previous Opens (since 1950):

Opens from 1962 through 1989 played the 11th hole as a par-5.

Past champions in the field

Made both cuts

Missed the first cut

Round summaries

First round
Wednesday, 11 July 1973

Second round
Thursday, 12 July 1973

Amateurs: Edwards (+6), Homer (+7), Russell (+7), Foster (+8),Stuart (+9), Milne (+10), Hedges (+13), Bonallack (+15), Sym (+15), Burch (+16), Eyles (+18), James (+24)

Third round
Friday, 13 July 1973

Amateurs: Edwards (+5), Foster (+10), Russell (+12), Homer (+16)

Final round
Saturday, 14 July 1973

Amateurs: Edwards (+8)
Source:

References

External links
Royal Troon 1973 (Official site)
102nd Open Championship - Royal Troon (European Tour)

The Open Championship
Golf tournaments in Scotland
Open Championship
Open Championship
Open Championship